Derek Ernest Gilmor Briggs (born 10 January 1950) is an Irish palaeontologist and taphonomist based at Yale University. Briggs is one of three palaeontologists, along with Harry Blackmore Whittington and Simon Conway Morris, who were key in the reinterpretation of the fossils of the Burgess Shale. He is the Yale University G. Evelyn Hutchinson Professor of Geology and Geophysics, Curator of Invertebrate Paleontology at Yale's Peabody Museum of Natural History, and former Director of the Peabody Museum.

Education
Briggs was educated at Trinity College Dublin where he graduated with a Bachelor of Arts degree in Geology in 1972. He went on to the University of Cambridge to work under British palaeontologist Harry Blackmore Whittington. He was awarded a PhD in 1976 on Arthropods from the Burgess Shale, Middle Cambrian, Canada.

Research and Career
While at the University of Cambridge, Briggs worked on the fossils of the Middle Cambrian Burgess Shale of British Columbia alongside a fellow student Simon Conway Morris, both under the supervision of Harry Whittington, on the exceptionally well-preserved Burgess Shale fauna. The Burgess Shale project subsequently became one of the most celebrated endeavours in the field of palaeontology in the latter half of the 20th century. On 1 July 2008 he took over as Director of the Yale Peabody Museum of Natural History. He became the G. Evelyn Hutchinson Professor of Geology and Geophysics at Yale in 2011.

Briggs's research is on the taphonomy, or preservation, and evolutionary significance of the exceptionally preserved fossil biotas known as Konservat-Lagerstätten – fossil formations that include evidence of faunal soft tissue. His work involves a range of approaches from experimental work on the factors controlling decay and fossilisation, through studies of early diagenetic mineralisation and organic preservation, to field work on a range of fossil occurrences.

Awards and honours 
1999 – Fellow of the Royal Society
2000 – Premio Capo d'Orlando (Italian prize for palaeontology)
2000 — Lyell Medal, Geological Society of London
2001 — Boyle Medal, Royal Dublin Society/Irish Times
2002–2004 – President, Palaeontological Association
2003 – Honorary Member of the Royal Irish Academy
2006–2008 — President, Paleontological Society
2008 – Humboldt Research Award
2009 – Bownocker Medal, Ohio State University
2015 – Paleontological Society Medal
2019 – Member of the American Academy of Arts and Sciences
2019 - Lapworth Medal, Palaeontological Association

His nomination for election to the Royal Society reads:

References

Living people
Irish paleontologists
Irish scientists
Academics of Goldsmiths, University of London
Fellows of Sidney Sussex College, Cambridge
Fellows of the Royal Society
Lyell Medal winners
Taphonomists
1950 births
Alumni of Trinity College Dublin
Yale University faculty
20th-century Irish scientists
21st-century Irish scientists